Austroargiolestes brookhousei is a species of Australian damselfly in the family Megapodagrionidae,
commonly known as a Barrington flatwing. 
It is endemic to northern New South Wales, where it inhabits streams and bogs.

Austroargiolestes brookhousei is a medium-sized to large, black and pale blue damselfly, without pruinescence.
Like other members of the family Megapodagrionidae, it rests with its wings outspread.

Etymology
In 1986, Günther Theischinger and Tony O'Farrell named this species brookhousei, an eponym in acknowledgement of the work of Peter Brookhouse who was responsible for collecting specimens for analysis.

Gallery

See also
 List of Odonata species of Australia

References 

Megapodagrionidae
Odonata of Australia
Insects of Australia
Endemic fauna of Australia
Taxa named by Günther Theischinger
Taxa named by A.F. (Tony) O'Farrell
Insects described in 1986
Damselflies